Bromodomain-containing protein 9 is a protein that in humans is encoded by the BRD9 gene.

Structure and interaction
BRD9 contains a bromodomain. It is closely related to BRD7. BRD9 is present in some SWI/SNF ATPase remodeling complexes.

Role in cancer
The BRD9 gene is frequently present in variable copy number in lung cancer.

Small molecule inhibition
Small molecules capable of binding to the bromodomain of BRD9 have been developed.

See also
Bromodomain

References

Human proteins